Rythu bazaar, or raithu bazaar, or raitubazar, is a type of farmers' market in Indian states of Andhra Pradesh and Telangana. It is run by the Governments of Andhra Pradesh and Telangana for small scale farmers with small landholdings. The first market started in January 1999 by N. Chandrababu Naidu. This helped small and middle scale farmers to sell their agricultural products directly to customers at some optimum price and helped them to financially sustain a little bit . The customers of towns and cities get these products directly from farmers at less rate . This helped farmers to sell their agricultural products directly to customers of towns and cities without involvement of any mediators , which financially assists them upto certain extent . And the customers get quality agricultural produce at reasonable rates .

See also

References

Further reading
 
 Businessline
 Mana Rythubazar
Bazaars in India
Retail markets in India
Economy of Hyderabad, India